Mfanafuthi Taribo Bhembe (born 9 October 1982 in Mbabane) is a Swaziland international footballer who plays for Mbabane Swallows.

Career
Bhembe began his career by Nkomazi Sundowns F.C. and joined on year later in 2000 to Mbabane Swallows, before he attended in July 2006 by Alabama A&M University.

United States
He notched 14 goals in 16 appearances during a surprise senior season in 2008 for Alabama A&M University of the SWAC Conference, helping the side to a 9–5–3 record last fall. The resulting 1.94 points per game were tied for the fifth most in Division I last season, while his 14 goals ranked tied for 10th overall.

Lagerwey says: "Futhi was the fifth leading goal scorer in Division I this season. He's a quick attacking player that got things done at the collegiate level, so we're anxious to see if that can translate to the pros."

Draft
Selected by Real Salt Lake in the fourth round (57th overall) of the 2009 MLS SuperDraft.

Then joined to Real Salt Lake in January 2009 and was released on Mid 2009.

Return to Africa
He returned to Mbabane Swallows on 10 February 2009 and signed on 10 July 2009 for South African club Jomo Cosmos.

Clubs
2003–2004: Royal Leopards F.C.
2004–2006: Mbabane Swallows
2006–2008: Alabama A&M University
2009: Mbabane Swallows
2009–2010: Jomo Cosmos

International
Bhembe was from 2005 to 2006 regular member of the Swaziland national football team and is currently on attention.

References

External links
 

1982 births
Living people
People from Mbabane
Alabama A&M Bulldogs men's soccer players
Swazi footballers
Eswatini international footballers
Swazi expatriate footballers
Expatriate soccer players in the United States
Royal Leopards F.C. players
Mbabane Swallows players
Jomo Cosmos F.C. players
Expatriate soccer players in South Africa
Real Salt Lake draft picks
Association football midfielders
Swazi expatriate sportspeople in South Africa
Swazi expatriate sportspeople in the United States